José Luis Clerc was the defending champion, but lost in the final to 16-year old Aaron Krickstein. The score was 7–6, 3–6, 6–4.

Seeds
The top eight seeds receive a bye into the second round.

Draw

Finals

Top half

Section 1

Section 2

Bottom half

Section 3

Section 4

References

External links
 Official results archive (ATP)
 Official results archive (ITF)

1984 Grand Prix (tennis)
U.S. Pro Tennis Championships
1984 in American tennis